GGL Stadium (or previously known as Altrad Stadium and Stade Yves-du-Manoir) is a multi-use stadium in Montpellier, France.  It is currently used mostly for rugby union matches and is the home stadium of Montpellier Hérault RC. The stadium is able to hold 15,697 spectators (12,734 seated). Rugby league side Catalans Dragons used the venue on 5 June 2011 with their tie against Wigan Warriors.

In 2014, Ligue 1 Association football team Montpellier HSC temporarily used the stadium during their 2014–15 season for home games after October floods in Montpellier. Their stadium Stade de la Mosson faced numerous floods and subsequent damages meant the team were unable to use its facility. Altrad held 5 fixtures during this time, 4 Ligue 1 matches and 1 Coupe de la Ligue game which lasted from 28 October up to their last game on 13 December 2014, before the team returned to their home stadium.

The stadium is named after GGL, a property company based in Montpellier.

References

External links

Stadium information 

Rugby union stadiums in France
Buildings and structures in Montpellier
Sports venues in Montpellier
Montpellier Hérault Rugby
Tourist attractions in Montpellier
Sports venues completed in 1928